Eric McMillan,  (born in Sheffield, England, in 1942) is a Canadian designer who began his career designing exhibitions.  By an extraordinary opportunity in 1972, he started designing play areas and elements that encouraged children to learn through play.  The concepts were composed of a great variety of materials.  He has been referred to as "The father of soft play".

Early life
He was born in 1942 in the midst of an air-raid to a working class mother in Sheffield: still-born but revived by the midwife who dipped him alternately in buckets of cold and warm water. At the age of five he moved to North Manchester, cared for by the wife of his blind grandfather.
Requiring glasses that he refused to wear or order to fight off bullying, he attended nine schools between five and fifteen, leaving from St Boniface's RC School, Higher Broughton, at the age of 15, barely literate.

As a feral child, he played in the derelict wrecks of houses and building sites in the shadow of Strangeways, Manchester. Play was unconstrained freedom.

He enrolled for an apprenticeship as a house painter, and at the college of art encountered students doing more creative courses.

Career

In 1968 he moved from The Canadian Government Exhibition Commission in Ottawa to Toronto to join the design team planning Ontario Place. When Ontario Place opened in 1971 the section of the exhibition he had designed called "Explosions" was the most successful exhibit in that first season.  In consequence of this success he was appointed chief designer for the whole project. The following year (1972) saw the opening of the "Children’s Village" land play area and from that project grew his reputation as a designer of children's play attractions.  The opening of the "Water Play" area in 1973 secured that reputation.  His work introduced ideas like the ball crawl (ball pit), net climb, punch bag forest, birdie glide, roller slide, cave crawl, together toys, foam swamp, water bicycle cannons, balancing buoys, rubber band bounce, and a whole range of interactive play elements.

Partnership
In 1975 together with partners Rosemarie Duell and Len Rydahl he formed a design partnership and went on to design play attractions around the world. "Captain Kid’s" at SeaWorld of Ohio was the first project built in the U.S. in 1975.  His list of projects include:  "Whale of a Time World" San Vallejo, California 1979;  "Sesame Place", Langhorne, Pennsylvania 1980;  "Parc de la Villette"  Paris, France 1984;  "Space Science Park" (United States Space Camp) Huntsville, Alabama 1984; "Children’s Museum Waterfront Attraction", Boston, Massachusetts 1987;  "Founders Park2 Nelson, New Zealand, 1987;  "Eureka!" Halifax England, 1988; and many other projects including work at World Expos’ 1967, 1976, 1984, 1986 .
Time magazine once described him as "The next Walt Disney."

Notable projects
 The Children's Village and Water Attraction, Ontario Place in Toronto, (1960)
 Captain Kid's at SeaWorld of Ohio;
Whale of a Time World San Vallejo, California, 1979;
Sesame Place, Philadelphia, Pennsylvania, 1980;
Parc de la Villette  Paris, France, 1984;
Space Science Park (United States Space Camp) Huntsville, Alabama, 1984;
Children's Museum Waterfront Attraction, Boston, Massachusetts, 1987;
Founders Park Nelson, New Zealand, 1987;
Eureka!, Halifax, England, 1988;
Many other projects including work at World Expos’ 1967, 1976, 1984, 1986 .

References

External links
 Eric McMillan

1942 births
Canadian people of Scottish descent
Canadian designers
Living people